Ferenc Kalmar (1928-2013) was a Serbian and Hungarian sculptor, living in Vojvodina. He died in 2013.

Biography 
Ferenc Kalmar was born in Subotica (Kingdom of Yugoslavia) on 25 May 1928. He began doing sculptures in 1947. He had his first solo exhibition in Subotica in 1956. During more than six decades of rich creative work he produced a unique oeuvre which revealed his inquisitive and exploitative mind. His universality is seen in his interest in various materials: ceramics, metal, wood and frequent change of medium, until his ultimate surrender to raw, magnetic energy of the unity of painting and sculpture, expressed in coloured wood sculptures. He died in his atelier in Subotica (Serbia) in 2013.

Artistic style 
At the beginning of the eighties, coloured wood successfully and permanently ranked Ferenc Kalmar among artists of outsider art in Serbia. His journey to the United States (in the early eighties) when he was fascinated with the art of distant Indian culture, Mayan art and reliefs on Egyptian tombstones stimulated new sources of inspiration, changed his philosophy of living and artistic perception. He watched Indian ritual dances where exotic dancers decorated with feathers, flowers and turquoise flitted like birds in the wind. 

As an explicitly authentic artist, the explorer of primordial unity, in the era of incredible speed and smoke of high technologies he provided us with the reminiscences of lost dimensions of everlasting childhood. With deep and surface incisions, the artist achieved the dynamics of closed and open, sharp and rounded forms, a dance of light and shadow. He coloured his figures with strong and bright tint and frequent interchanges of red and green, blue and yellow. The colour always followed the development of volume, whether related to gorgeous branching or delicately stylized and calm forms. The combination of the sculptural and the pictorial bears witness of the artist's complexity and expressiveness with additional help of naturally "blooming" forms, and nearly fauvist, wild tint. Kalmar the sculptor is sometimes overmastered by Kalmar the painter! The mere procedure of embodiment of the artist’s idea is an indispensable ritual where the artist and wood intertwine, surrender, snatch and combine. Animals are basic objects of Kalmar's inspiration: birds, bugs, lizards, grasshoppers, butterflies. His artistic credo is fully expressed in monumental and brightly painted birds. 
“Birds are divine creatures. Man is astonished with their grace and tenderness. Monuments should be erected to these beautiful creatures because our generations may be the last who are lucky to listen to nightingales in nature” he used to say.

Exhibitions and awards 
The numerous collection of his sculptures is at Museum of Naïve and Marginal Art (MNMA), Jagodina, Serbia. 
He exhibited worldwide and he was awarded several times. 
The most significant awards are Forum’s Prize for Art Novi Sad, Serbia, 1993) and the Award for Entire Artistic Work at the Thirteenth International Biennial of Naïve and Marginal Art, MNMA, Jagodina, 2007.

Gallery

References

Literature 
 Krstić, N (2003) Naïve Art of Serbia. Belgrade: SASA - Jagodina: MNMA
 Krstić, N (2007) Naïve and Marginal Art of Serbia. Jagodina: MNMA
 Krstić, N (2013) Outsiders. Catalog. Jagodina: MNMA
 Krstić, N (2014) Outsider Art in Serbia. Jagodina: MNMA

External links

 Kalmar Ferenc - Museum of Naïve and Marginal Art, Jagodina, Serbia
 OUTSIDER ARTISTS IN THE COLLECTION OF MNMA

Outsider artists
Naïve art
Serbian sculptors
Male sculptors
Hungarian sculptors
Serbian painters
Artists from Subotica
Hungarians in Vojvodina
1928 births
2013 deaths